Belair, Florida, or similar, may refer to:
Belair, Leon County, Florida
Bellair, Clay County, Florida
Bel-Air, Florida in Seminole County
Belleair, Florida in Pinellas County

See also
Belleair Beach, Florida in Pinellas County
Belleair Bluffs, Florida in Pinellas County
Belleair Shore, Florida in Pinellas County
Bel Air, Los Angeles